Children of Fortune (German: Kinder des Glücks) is a 1931 British-German crime film directed by Alexander Esway and starring Dina Gralla, Kurt Vespermann and Vicky Werckmeister. It was made as the German-language version of Children of Chance. It was made at Elstree Studios and distributed in Germany by Süd-Film, which was owned by British International Pictures.

Cast
 Dina Gralla 
 Kurt Vespermann 
 Vicky Werckmeister 
 Jenny Kiefe 
 Wera Engels 
 Ekkehard Arendt 
 Michael von Newlinsky 
 Teddy Bill 
 Rudolf Meinhard-Jünger

References

Bibliography
 Murphy, Robert. Directors in British and Irish Cinema: A Reference Companion. British Film Institute, 2006.

External links

1931 films
1931 crime films
1930s German-language films
Films directed by Alexander Esway
British crime films
German crime films
Films shot at British International Pictures Studios
German multilingual films
German black-and-white films
British black-and-white films
1931 multilingual films
1930s British films
1930s German films